is a conservative Japanese politician of the Liberal Democratic Party, a member of the House of Councillors in the Diet (national legislature). He was born in Kyoto Prefecture on 19 September 1958, graduated from Shiga University in 1981, became certified public tax accountant by passing the Licensed Tax Accountant Examination in 1984 and was elected to the House of Councillors for the first time in 2007 after serving in the assembly of Kyoto Prefecture since 1990.

In early 2011, he was involved in a political scandal, revealing information that forced Seiji Maehara to resign.

He is associated with Japanese nationalist groups, such as Ganbare Nihon. Recently, he accused Prime Minister Yoshihiko Noda of affiliation with South Korea.

He became the chairman of Special Committee on Nuclear Power Issues in 2014 and the chairman of Special Committee on Regional Issues and Consumer Affairs in the House of Councillors.

References

External links 
  in Japanese.

1958 births
Living people
People from Kyoto Prefecture
Members of the House of Councillors (Japan)
Liberal Democratic Party (Japan) politicians
Members of the Kyoto Prefectural Assembly